The 2015 Indiana Hoosiers baseball team is a college baseball team that represented Indiana University in the 2015 NCAA Division I baseball season. The Hoosiers are members of the Big Ten Conference (B1G) and played their home games at Bart Kaufman Field in Bloomington, Indiana. They were led by first-year head coach Chris Lemonis. 

Following the conclusion of the regular season, the Hoosiers were selected to play in the 2015 NCAA Tournament, beginning in the Nashville Regional. The Hoosiers would eventually lose in the semifinals of the Nashville Regional to Radford by a score of 3–5.

Nashville Regional 

 Nashville Regional Scores Source

References

Indiana
Indiana Hoosiers baseball seasons
Indiana Hoosiers baseball
2015 NCAA Division I baseball tournament participants